Western Sydney International (Nancy-Bird Walton) Airport , also known as Western Sydney Airport or Badgerys Creek Airport, is a new international airport currently under construction within the suburb of Badgerys Creek, New South Wales, Australia. The airport is planned to have 24-hour and curfew-free operations and will supplement Kingsford Smith Airport, which has reached capacity due to a legislated curfew and flight caps. The first stage of construction on the new airport began on 24 September 2018, and the first stage is expected to be complete and open by December 2026. The site was officially designated by the Federal Government on 15 April 2014, after decades of debate on the location of another airport within Greater Sydney.

History

Operating since 1919, Sydney (Kingsford Smith) Airport is one of the world's oldest airports.  Located only 8 km from the city centre, the airport site is now hemmed in on three sides by urban growth and on the fourth side by Botany Bay. The aforementioned reasons mean that expansion of Kingsford Smith Airport is highly difficult, as to expand the field, large areas of land need to be reclaimed from the sea or gathered through resumptions and suburb demolitions, both of which are extremely costly solutions. There have thus been various proposals to build a second airport for Sydney since the 1960s.

The Federal Government announced in February 1986 that Badgerys Creek had been chosen as the location for a second major airport for Sydney. The Federal Government then undertook a series of land acquisitions for the site, primarily during the period 1986 to 1991, and spent approximately 170 million. The resulting site totalled .

However, following the purchase, the decision was made by the Government that construction of a third runway at Sydney Airport was more appropriate, and all work on the site was halted.  The runway, which was built on reclaimed land, was opened in 1994.

Despite the expansion, concerns remained that Kingsford Smith Airport would run out of capacity by 2030, especially since the introduction of strict night flying restrictions in 1995.  Planning for a second airport thus began again in earnest in 2008. A 3,200-page joined Federal/NSW study released in 2012 concluded that Badgerys Creek was "clearly the best site for a much-needed second airport for Sydney" and recommended that planning should start. On 15 April 2014, the Federal Government announced that Badgerys Creek would be the site of the Second Sydney Airport. In September 2018, construction works began at the Badgerys Creek Airport site.

On 4 March 2019, the federal government proclaimed that the airport would be named Nancy Bird Walton International Airport in honour of the Australian aviator Nancy Bird Walton. NSW Premier Gladys Berejiklian stated that the naming is an "absolutely inspiring choice" as the name for the new airport. Australian Prime Minister Scott Morrison stated that "we now recognise Australia's greatest female aviation pioneer" in the naming of the airport, and members of Walton's family stated that they were "extremely excited and thrilled, and it's just a huge honour" for their mother and grandmother.

On 10 December 2020, a light aircraft made an emergency landing on earthworks at the construction site, which was the airport's first arrival.

Geography
The Township of Luddenham is located adjacent to the airport,  from the runway. It is also located within  of the World Heritage-listed Blue Mountains National Park, sparking serious concerns about declared wilderness, wild rivers, amenities, World Heritage status, and the City of the Blue Mountains economy.

Legislation
The  enables the development and use of an airport, known as Sydney West Airport. The Airport Plan released by the Commonwealth Government in December 2016 notes that the airport is referred to in the Act as Sydney West Airport is commonly known as Western Sydney Airport, and is officially known as Western Sydney International (Nancy Bird Walton) Airport; named in honour of Nancy Bird Walton, the youngest Australian woman to gain a pilot's licence.

Economy
The Federal Government claimed the initial construction phase is expected to generate around 4,000 jobs, and the airport development is expected to create 35,000 jobs by 2035, increasing to 60,000 jobs over time. Prime Minister Scott Morrison claimed that the airport would "create 11,000 jobs during construction" and "28,000 within its first 5 years". However, such claims were contradicted by the 2017 labour market analysis commissioned by the Government. The analysis states that the airport is predicted to directly support 3,231 jobs during construction over eight years, 13,169 from the airport combined with a business park during the first five years of operation, and 24,046 from the combined airport and business park over the following ten years. 

The Western Sydney Aerotropolis is the land use town planning package involving re-zoning and development plans that applies to land around the airport and what will be known as the Western Parkland City. The Aerotropolis will become a thriving economic centre in Western Sydney.  Benefiting from its proximity to the new airport, the Aerotropolis will contribute towards 200,000 new jobs in the Western Parkland City and become a high-skill jobs hub across aerospace and defence, manufacturing, healthcare, freight and logistics, agribusiness, education and research industries.

Flight paths 
On 19 October 2015, the draft environmental impact statement (EIS) was released by the Abbott Government. This Statement outlined the proposed flight paths for Western Sydney Airport from the initial opening in the mid-2020s flight paths for an international expansion. Unlike Sydney airport, no 'flight sharing' was proposed to reduce noise impacts on individual suburbs. Instead, flight paths followed a single loop turning either southwest or continuing southeast after the Blaxland merge point, then either northeast or southwest towards Badgerys Creek. Assessment of noise impacts were based solely on these flight paths.

After an extensive community backlash and as a measure to retain her seat of Macquarie, Liberal Louise Markus and the Coalition government announced a scrapping of the Blaxland merge point. The final EIS, released on 15 September 2016, revealed that the flight paths, although remaining the same, were marked as 'indicative only'. A consistent message portrayed to the public since then is that the flight paths are unknown, will not be released, noise impacts will not be assessed nor community consultation undertaken until after construction of the airport. Markus lost her seat at that election, with a swing against her of 9.2 percent, the first time that Macquarie had not been a 'bellwether' seat.

Initial development 
The airport will be built in phases, with the initial construction phase building a smaller airport with a single runway. The cost of the initial development was estimated at 2.4 billion (as of 2012) and would generate 4,000 jobs. The government plans the initial phase would be complete and operational by 2025. Sydney Airport Corporation, the operator of Kingsford Smith Airport, was given the right of first refusal to build and operate any second airport in an agreement reached with the Government when Kingsford Smith Airport was sold in 2002. Sydney Airport declined the offer to build and operate the airport on 2 May 2017.

The airport will not have a night-time curfew, unlike Kingsford Smith Airport.

Ground transport

Road connections

With the designation of the site as the location of Sydney's Second Airport, announcements were made on new and upgraded transport links to the airport and surrounding areas of western Sydney. Known as the Western Sydney Infrastructure Plan, it included:
 A new M12 east-west motorway to the airport, around the current alignment of Elizabeth Drive between the M7 Westlink Motorway and The Northern Road
 Upgrading of The Northern Road (A9) to a minimum of four lanes from Narellan to the M4 Western Motorway
 Upgrading of Bringelly Road to a minimum of four lanes between The Northern Road and Camden Valley Way

Rail connections

In April 2014, the Commonwealth Government said it had no plans to build a rail line. However, it indicated provision for a railway line would be included in the development that may include preparing tunnels under the runway as part of the runway construction and preparing the underground space for a station. It was considered likely the rail connection to the airport would consist of an extension to the South West Rail Link from Leppington. In October 2015, Prime Minister Malcolm Turnbull indicated that the airport would need both road and rail links to the Sydney CBD. In November 2015 a scoping study into rail investment to service Western Sydney and the Western Sydney Airport was announced. The study was jointly managed by the NSW and the Commonwealth governments. A discussion paper, released in September 2016, proposed various options that could provide a rail link to the airport:

The final report, released in March 2018, proposed that two lines would ultimately service the airport: a "North-South Link" from Schofields to Macarthur and an "East-West Link" from Parramatta to the "Badgerys Creek Aerotropolis", an area south of the airport. The East-West Link would likely form an extension of the already-announced Sydney Metro West. An extension of the South West Rail Link to the Badgerys Creek Aerotropolis was also proposed. Interchanging with the North-South Link or East-West Link would be required to access the airport itself.

At the same time, the state and the federal governments announced the development of a new rail line serving the airport that would form part of the North-South Link, running south from St Marys to the airport before it continued on to the Badgerys Creek Aerotropolis. Funding for the line will be equally split between the State and the Federal governments. The report suggested that "a metro or light metro style of train would suit the North-South Link". The line, now known as Western Sydney Airport line, is scheduled to open by the airport's opening in 2026.

Bus connections
New express bus routes to the airport precinct were announced in March 2018, running from Penrith, Liverpool and Campbelltown.

Controversy

Leppington Triangle corruption investigation 
The 29.8 million land purchase was for a portion of a second runway, expected to be needed after 2050. Eleven months after the purchase, the parcel of land was valued at just $3.1 million, triggering an investigation by the Australian National Audit Office (ANAO). For the purposes of realigning The Northern Road, the NSW Government acquired an adjacent  portion of the Leppington Triangle for 149,000; a land value 22 times less per hectare than that paid by the Commonwealth Government for its portion. The ANAO found serious shortcomings in the Commonwealth's acquisition processes, including that:
 the government did not exercise appropriate due diligence in its acquisition, and fell short of ethical standards
 an appropriate acquisition strategy was not developed
 the approach taken to valuing the land was inappropriate
 decision-makers were not appropriately advised on the land acquisition
 the incomplete advice provided to decision-makers, and the inadequate response when questions were raised by the ANAO, was inconsistent with effective and ethical stewardship of public resources.

Subsequent to this, the Australian Federal Police announced that they were investigating potential corruption related to the land deal.

Timeline

Development milestones

Construction timeline

See also 

Second Sydney Airport
List of airports in Greater Sydney

References

External links

 Project site
 Western Sydney Rail Study site
 Final EIS
 Flight Paths

Airports in New South Wales
Airports in Greater Sydney
Abbott Government
Western Sydney
Proposed airports in Australia
City of Liverpool (New South Wales)
International airports in Australia